Anjeza Shahini (born 4 May 1987) is an Albanian singer. She is best known for representing Albania at 2004 Eurovision Song Contest in Istanbul, after winning the 42nd edition of Festivali i Këngës.

Career

2003–2009 

Anjeza Shahini was born on 4 May 1987 in the city of Tirana, then part of the People's Republic of Albania, present Albania. In 2003, Shahini won the first edition of "Ethet e së premtes mbrëma". In later 2003, along with 29 other singers, she competed in the Festivali I Këngës 42 with the song "Imazhi yt". After two preliminary rounds, Shahini reached the final on 20 December, at the end of which, hosts Adi Krasta and Ledina Çelo presented her as the winner of the combined jury and televote. That meant she would represent Albania in the 2004 Eurovision Song Contest in Istanbul, Turkey, in Albania's debut year in the competition. For the ESC finals, a three-minute English version of the song entitled "The Image of You" was created. Anjeza sang in the semi-final of ESC on 12 May 2004, and finished fourth out of twenty-two. This top-ten finish, secured Anjeza a place in the final where on 15 May she competed with contestants from twenty-four other countries and finished seventh with a total of 106 points.

 
In 2004, Anjeza recorded a song ("Në mes nesh") with Kosovo-Albanian band Marigona. In 2005 she signed a contract with an artist management agency based in Vienna. During her two years in Vienna she continued private studies in music and collaborated with the well known Austrian producer Harald Hanisch, including the song "Pse Ndal" (Why Stop) which was used at the Albanian National Song Festival (Festivali i Këngës), the Albanian selection process for the Eurovision Song Contest. Anjeza Shahini made it through the two semi-finals to the last twenty at the National Final and was one of the favourites to win. However, at the final, which aired on 18 December 2005, the winner was announced as the song "Zjarr e ftohtë", sung by Luiz Ejlli.

On 3 June 2006, Anjeza Shahini was a special guest performer at the Euro Video Grand Prix contest, which was held in Albania. She opened the contest with the song "Welcome to Europe".

In 2007, Anjeza returned to Albania and signed a contract with the Albanian record label "Eurostar". She performed at Këngët e Shekullit 2, a successful series on TV Klan consisting of remakes of the best Albanian songs from the past century. She took part in Kënga Magjike 2007 with the song "Nxënësja më e mirë" ("The best student"), where the other singers' votes landed her in 4th place, but she did receive the critics' award.

In August 2008, Anjeza Shahini released her first album, Erdhi momenti, containing only new songs, all in Albanian. Some of the songs were composed by Adrian Hila, but she also collaborated with other well known composers such as Pirro Cako, Alfred Kacinari and Genti Myftaraj and some of the lyrics were written by Anjeza's sister, Bela. The songs "Erdhi Momenti" and "Lot Pendimi" were promoted with a music video produced by Max Production.

Anjeza Shahini took part in Festivali i Këngës 48 with the ballad "Në pasqyrë" (In the mirror), placing second.

2010–present 

In 2010, Shahini finished her contract with Eurostar and became an independent artist. In the same year she completed her studies in International Relations at the European University of Tirana. In 2011, she participated for the first time in Top Fest performing a duet with Kosovo band Dren Abazi & Zig Zag Orchestra. Their song "Ti dhe une" got "Best Interpretation" award. A music video was released after in partnership with "PinkMoon" production. In 2012, she released the ballad "Te desha shume", composed by Endrit Shani and produced by Sebastian Video Production.

Anjeza Shahini was again very close to winning ""Festivali I Kenges"" in 2012 2013 with the song "LOVE", but the jury placed her second.

Anjeza Shahini was a guest in the new release of the German artist Martin Kilger in the song "Kastanien Lied" a song dedicated to Albania,she plays the role of Albanian girl, singing her part in the Albanian language.

During 2014 she released three singles in collaboration with the songwriter Mario Deda. Together they produced "Ujë në shkretëtirë" a triphop ballad. The video was produced in partnership with ID Production. Soon that year they released the song "Magnet" a project supported by an Albanian development company. The video produced by Entermedia showcases tall and new buildings of Tirana projecting a new, futuristic capital city of Albania, (electronic pop-dance).

In October 2014, Shahini released the song "Energji" (Energy), an electronic pop-drum & bass, the song was performed at Kenga Magjike and received the award "Tendence" (Best Trend Song).

Anjeza appeared on the BBC Eurovision 2017 semi-final show with Scott Mills and Lucie Jones and performed at the second annual Eurostarz event in London, together with other Eurovision former acts, including Anne Marie David, Kurt Calleja, Mihai Traistariu, Karl William Lund and Salena Mastroianni.

Discography

Albums 
 Erdhi Momenti (2008)

Singles 
 Nëse të ndodh (2003)
 The Image of You (2004)
 Mes nesh ft. Marigona Band (2004)
 Pse ndal (2005)
 Welcome to Europe (2006)
 Nxënësja më e mirë (2007)
 Ne pasqyrë (2009)
 Ti dhe unë ft. Dren Abazi & ZZOrchestra (2011)
 Të desha shume (2012)
 Nesër nuk do të jetë njësoj (2012)
 Love (2012)
 Ujë në shkretëtirë (2014)
 Magnet (2014)
 Energji (2014)
 Neser nuk do te jete njesoj (2013)

Guest appearance
 Kastanien Lied (2013)

Soundtracks
 Dashuria e Bjeshkëve te Nemuna 2 (2013 film)

Awards 

Festivali i Këngës

|-
||2003
||"The Image of You"
|First Prize
|
|-
||2008
||"Në pasqyrë"
|Contestant
|
|-
||2012
||"Love"
|Contestant
|
|}
  
Kënga Magjike

|-
||2007
||"Nxënësja më e mirë"
|Critic Prize
|
|- 
||2014
||"Energji"
|Trend Prize
|
|}

Zhurma Show Awards

|-
||2009
||"'Erdhi momenti'"
|Best Rock
|
|}

Netët e Klipt Shqiptar

|-
||2010
||"Lotë pendimi"
|Best Performer
|
|}

Top Fest

|-
||2012
||"Ti dhe unë (ft. Dren Abazi)"
|Best Performer
|
|}

Video Fest Awards

|-
||2012
||"Ti dhe unë (ft. Dren Abazi)"
|Best Collaboration
|
|}

References

External links 

 
 Spotify

1987 births
Living people
Musicians from Tirana
21st-century Albanian women singers
Festivali i Këngës winners
Eurovision Song Contest entrants for Albania
Eurovision Song Contest entrants of 2004
English-language singers from Albania
Romani musicians